CSEE is an initialism that may stand for:
Canadian Society for Electrical Engineering, a predecessor of the Canadian Society of Electrical and Computer Engineering and IEEE Canada
Certificate of Secondary Education Examination (Tanzania) 
Certificate of Secondary Education Examination in the United Kingdom
Certified Sport Event Executive, an accreditation offered by the National Association of Sports Commissions
Chinese Society for Electrical Engineering
Civil, structural and environmental engineering
Compagnie de Signaux et d'Entreprises Electriques, a division of Ansaldo STS
Computer Science and Electrical Engineering
Canadian Society for Ecology and Evolution